The 11061 / 11062 Lokmanya Tilak Terminus Mumbai–Darbhanga Pawan Express is an Express train belonging to Central Railway zone that runs between Lokmanya Tilak Terminus, Mumbai &  in India.

It operates as train number 11061 from Lokmanya Tilak Terminus to Darbhanga Junction and as train number 11062 in the reverse direction serving the states of Maharashtra, Madhya Pradesh, Uttar Pradesh and Bihar .

Coaches

The 11061 / 11062 Lokmanya Tilak Terminus–Darbhanga Darbhanga Express has 1 AC 2 tier, 1 AC 3 tier, 12 Sleeper Class, 6 General Unreserved & 2 SLR (Generator cum Luggage Rake) coaches. In addition, it carries a pantry car   .
 
As is customary with most train services in India, coach composition may be amended at the discretion of Indian Railways depending on demand.

Service

As the average speed of the train is below , as per Indian Railways rules, its fare does not include a Superfast surcharge.

Routeing

Traction

As sections of the route are yet to be fully electrified, until 2020  an Itarsi-based WAP-4  hauled the train from Lokmanya Tilak Terminus until  after which a pair of Itarsi-based WDM-3A
or WDP-4 hauled the train for the remainder of its journey..

Operation

11061 Lokmanya Tilak Terminus–Darbhanga Express runs from Lokmanya Tilak Terminus daily, reaching  on the 3rd day.
11062 Darbhanga–Lokmanya Tilak Terminus Express runs from Darbhanga Junction daily, reaching Lokmanya Tilak Terminus on the 3rd day.

See also 

 Lokmanya Tilak Terminus
 Bhagalpur–Lokmanya Tilak Terminus Superfast Express
 Lokmanya Tilak Terminus–Muzaffarpur Pawan Express

References 

 http://www.irfca.org/gallery/Events/cracdcjan13/
 https://www.youtube.com/watch?v=Q4Zk5Jy-_Kg
 http://irfca.org/apps/locolinks/show/100

External links

Transport in Mumbai
Express trains in India
Rail transport in Maharashtra
Rail transport in Madhya Pradesh
Rail transport in Uttar Pradesh
Rail transport in Bihar
Transport in Darbhanga
Named passenger trains of India